Lankershim and West Lankershim are archaic place names in what is now the greater North Hollywood section of the San Fernando Valley region of Los Angeles County, California.

Settlements 

Lankershim was originally named Toluca. The center of the town, laid out by James Boon Lankershim and his brother-in-law I.N. Van Nuys, was the "intersection of present day Chandler Blvd. and Lankershim Blvd." Lankershim agreed to be annexed to the City of Los Angeles in 1923. The intent of annexation was to connect the settlements access to the water from the Los Angeles Aqueduct system. West Lankershim agreed to be annexed to the City of Los Angeles in 1919. West Lankershim has been described as the "Valley Plaza area of North Hollywood" or as basically what is now called Valley Village.

The name of the local post office was changed from Toluca to Lankershim in 1912. In 1925 the population of Lankershim was 2,000. The current name North Hollywood was adopted August 15, 1927 to capitalize "on the glamour of Hollywood to the southeast." The post office address was legally changed that day and "all the signs along Magnolia Boulevard, Lankershim Boulevard and other large highways have been painted out from signs and the new name substituted."

Depot 
The Lankershim Depot building was "brought to its present-day site on rail cars and assembled" in 1896 as the Toluca Depot of the Southern Pacific Railway. According to the Los Angeles Conservancy, "At the time…fruit was one of the area’s chief industries. The railroad tracks and stations, including this one, were built to connect the region's agricultural industry to the ports. The building is a one-story wooden structure that originally contained an office and a waiting area."

One of the "few remaining wood-frame, 19th century railroad stations in Southern California," the depot was dual service for Southern Pacific and the Pacific Electric railway from 1911 until it was closed to rail activity in 1952. The historic depot building survives and is located near the current North Hollywood Metro station for the pedestrian tunnel-connected B Line and G Line transit routes. It was subject to a $3.6 million restoration completed in 2016. The renovation incorporated "ADA requirements such as hand railings and ramp lighting." Since 2017, Lankershim Depot has housed a Groundwork coffee shop.

The present site of the Lankershim Depot is

Library 

The Lankershim branch of the Los Angeles Co. Free Library was established November 1914 and located at the "newspaper office." The Lankershim branch was located at 11228 Margate Avenue . The Lankershim branch officially joined LAPL in February 1924, and was renamed in 1927 and became the Sidney Lanier branch. The branch moved to its current location in 1929.

Gallery

References

External links 

 Historical Marker Database: Lankershim Train Depot
 Boundary additions to City of Los Angeles

Former Southern Pacific Railroad stations in California
North Hollywood, Los Angeles
History of Los Angeles